Post Orgasmic Chill is the third studio album by British rock band Skunk Anansie, first released in 1999. Two album covers exist: the European version with the band lounging in an oceanside apartment, and the American version with the band standing on the Atlantic City boardwalk. It was a complete departure from their previous two albums, which had elements of punk rock and alternative rock by moving to a new harder sound with elements of hard rock and alternative metal.
It took eleven years for the group to release their next album, Wonderlustre.

Etymology
The album title resembles the title of the 13th song, a Japanese bonus track called "Post Orgasmic Sleep".

Legacy
The album was included in the book 1001 Albums You Must Hear Before You Die.

Track listing
All tracks written by Skunk Anansie; except where indicated

Personnel
Skunk Anansie
 Skin – vocals, theremin, vibraphone
 Cass – electric bass, acoustic bass, programming
 Ace – electric guitar, acoustic guitar
 Mark Richardson – drums, percussion

Other personnel
 Wil Malone – strings, arrangement, conductor
 Michael Nash Associates – design
 Clif Norrell – engineering
 Chris Laidlaw – assistant engineering
 Howie Weinberg – mastering
 Steve Sisco – assistant mixing
 Andy Wallace – production, mixing

Charts

Weekly charts

Year-end charts

Certifications

References

1999 albums
Albums produced by Andy Wallace (producer)
Skunk Anansie albums
Virgin Records albums